The Black River is a river of Minnesota. It is a tributary of the Rainy River.

Black River was so named on account of its water being discolored by peat.

See also
List of rivers of Minnesota

References

Minnesota Watersheds
USGS Hydrologic Unit Map - State of Minnesota (1974)

Rivers of Koochiching County, Minnesota
Rivers of Minnesota